Myinmu  is a river town in the south-east of the Sagaing Division in Burma. The town has a rich history linked to World War II during the Burma Campaign against the Japanese, in 1944. It was also under the control of the Portuguese Missionaries in the 19th century. One of the first agricultural cooperatives was established here in 1905.

Geography
Myinmu is the principal town of Myinmu Township and the town lies on the northern bank of the Irrawaddy River. The population within  radius of the town is reported to be 19,452. Other settlements of note in the vicinity are Allagappa to the west and Ngaizun, located several miles away on the opposite side of the river.

Climate
Myinmu has a hot semi-arid climate that borders on a tropical savanna climate (BSh bordering on Aw according to the Köppen climate classification) with a wet season and a dry season and with the temperature being warm year-round. The wet season runs from May to October and the rest of the year is the dry season. The hottest temperatures happen during April and May as the wet season starts.

History
Myinmu was occupied by Portuguese missionaries in the late 19th century who established Roman Catholic Mission in Myinmu and opened stations at Nabet and Chaung-U.

One of the earliest cooperatives in Burma was established in Myinmu township in March 1905 with 19 members. Myinmu was occupied by the British Indian Army during the Burma Campaign against the Japanese in 1944. Douglas Gracey occupied Myinmu on February 13, 1944 and crossed the Irrawaddy.

Economy
Mynimu and the surrounding township rely on agriculture for their livelihoods and are located relatively close to the market in Mandalay. The principal crop is rice and farmers in the township have been reported to have devised new ways to reduce weed problems by replacing alternate wet-seeded rice with transplanted rice.

In the close precincts of the Myinmu Township, a small irrigation scheme, known as the Letpan Dam project, has been implemented in the year 2004,  on the Letpan Creek to the north of Tawchaung Oo Village. This has helped in improving the economic conditions of the farmers in the area. This is the 15th irrigation project implemented in the Sagaing district.

Another economic activity supported by the Japan International Cooperation Agency (JICA) is of rearing pigs and growing mushrooms. This pilot project was undertaken jointly by the Ministry of Livestock and Fisheries, the Ministry of Cooperatives and the Ministry of Agriculture and Irrigation, as a poverty  alleviation programme in the dry zone under a development study on sustainable agriculture and rural development. The pilot project spread over 3 years involved six townships in three divisions  including the Myinmu and Ayadaw townships in Sagaing Division. It is reported that the pig rearing programme was a supplement to growing food crops such as paddy during the cropping season, which improved the economic condition of the farmers. Under this pilot study, 2 pigs and four goats were given to the farmers of the villages on the basis that the farmers would repay the cost of the livestock after one year. Farmers who were interviewed were confident of the success of this scheme to supplement their income.

One more pilot project taken up under the same assistance programme, implemented by the Ministry of Agriculture related to planting of mushrooms at low cost. It was surmised that an investment of K 2500 could double in a short span of two weeks.

References

Township capitals of Myanmar
Populated places in Sagaing District